LLU Sporta klubs is a Latvian rugby club based in Jelgava. The team is the official rugby team of the Latvia University of Agriculture (Latvijas Lauksaimniecības universitāte).

External links
LLU Sporta klubs at draugiem.lv

Latvian rugby union teams
Jelgava